Sir John George Bourinot,  (October 24, 1836 – October 13, 1902) was a Canadian journalist, historian, and civil servant, sole author of the first Canadian effort in 1884 to document Parliamentary Procedure and Practice, and remembered as an expert in parliamentary procedure and constitutional law.

Life
Born in Sydney, Nova Scotia, he was the oldest son of John Bourinot. He was educated at Sydney before enrolling at Trinity College, Toronto, in 1854. Although he was a good student, he left the university two years later and worked as a parliamentary reporter for a Toronto newspaper. In 1860, he was in Halifax, where he founded, together with Joseph C. Crosskill, his own newspaper, the Evening Reporter. In May 1867, Bourinot left this newspaper and worked as a freelance writer for some time, until he secured a job as a clerk at the Senate of Canada in May 1869. In the following years, he steadily advanced through various grades until he was appointed chief clerk of the House of Commons of Canada in December 1880. a post he would occupy until his death 22 years later.

A founding member of the Royal Society of Canada, he also acted as its honorary secretary, and in 1892 served as president of the society. He wrote many books political history, some of which were considered references for decades to come. His Parliamentary Procedure and Practice in Canada (Montréal, 1884) is considered a standard work. How Canada is governed (Toronto, 1895) was a widely used textbook, and Canada under British rule, 1760 – 1900 (Cambridge, England, 1900) was also popular. He also wrote books about the history of Nova Scotia, and several more on constitutional law.  He also created the work that was posthumously to be called Bourinot's Rules of Order.

Bourinot was an advocate of Imperial Federation and a proponent of both a national university and library of Canada. He also was in favour of the right of women to higher education.  In his later life, Bourinot received honorary degrees from many Canadian universities and was created CMG in 1890 and KCMG in 1898. He died in Ottawa, Ontario and was buried in Beechwood Cemetery there.

Honours
Bourinot was elected a member of the American Antiquarian Society in 1893.

Works
 The Intellectual Development In The Canadian People, (1881)
 French Canada, (1887)
 Our Intellectual Strength And Weakness, (1893)
 Sea, Forest, And Prairie..., (1893)
 Canada, (1897)
 Builders Of Nova Scotia, (1900)
 Canada Under British Rule 1760-1900, (1900)
 Constitutional History, (1901)
 Lord Elgin, (1903)
 Canada [2nd edition with William H INGRAM], (1922)
 How Canada Is Governed, (?)
 Catalogue Of The Library Of The Late Sir John Bourinot, (1906)
 Parliamentary Procedure And Government In Canada, (?/?)
 Cape Breton And Its Memorials Of The French Régime, (?)
 
Source:

References

Further reading
 Banks, M. A.: Sir John George Bourinot, Victorian Canadian: His Life, Times, and Legacy, McGill-Queen's University Press, 2001. .
Margaret A. Banks, “Bourinot, Sir John George,” Dictionary of Canadian Biography, vol. 13, University of Toronto/Université Laval, 2003–
Claude Bélanger, Bourinot, John George at the Québec History Encyclopedia.

External links 
 
 
 

1836 births
1902 deaths
19th-century Canadian historians
Canadian male non-fiction writers
Canadian Knights Commander of the Order of St Michael and St George
Fellows of the Royal Society of Canada
Historians of Canada
Journalists from Nova Scotia
Clerks of the House of Commons (Canada)
Members of the American Antiquarian Society
People from Sydney, Nova Scotia
Persons of National Historic Significance (Canada)
Burials at Beechwood Cemetery (Ottawa)